Orpe is a river of North Rhine-Westphalia and Hesse, Germany. It flows into the Diemel in Diemelstadt-Wrexen.

See also
List of rivers of Hesse

References

Rivers of Hesse
Rivers of North Rhine-Westphalia
Rivers of Germany